The Casper Fire Department Station No. 1, also known as Casper Municipal Garage and Fire Station, was built in 1921.  It was listed on the National Register of Historic Places in 1993.
 
It was designed by Casper architects Garbutt, Weidner and Sweeney in Late Gothic Revival style.  It is a two-story  brick building with decorative terra cotta manufactured by the Denver Terra Cotta Company.

References

Fire stations in Wyoming
Government buildings on the National Register of Historic Places in Wyoming
Gothic Revival architecture in Wyoming
Government buildings completed in 1921
National Register of Historic Places in Natrona County, Wyoming
Fire stations on the National Register of Historic Places
1921 establishments in Wyoming